Jester is the name of three supervillains appearing in American comic books published by Marvel Comics.

Publication history

The original Jester first appeared in Daredevil #42 (July 1968) and was created by Stan Lee and Gene Colan.

The second Jester first appeared in Cloak and Dagger vol. 3 #8 and was created by Terry Austin, Mike Vosburg, and Don Cameron. The Civil War: Battle Damage Report one-shot established this Jester's real name as Jody Putt. He also received an entry in  The Official Handbook of the Marvel Universe A-Z vol. 6 hardcover.

Fictional character biography

Jonathan Powers

Jonathan Powers was the first of several costumed criminals to use the identity of the Jester. He was primarily an enemy of Daredevil.

Jonathan Powers was born in Hoboken, New Jersey. He was a struggling actor with a huge ego who finally got his big break as the leading character in an off-Broadway revival of Cyrano de Bergerac. Panned by critics, jeered by the audience, and disdained by his fellow performers, Powers was fired after one performance. Obsessively, he continued to study the various arts and crafts that he thought would earn him roles, things like gymnastics and body building. He turned down suggestions that he should take actual acting classes, insisting that he already had more raw acting talent than anyone who had ever lived. Still, Powers was only able to find employment as a stooge in a children's television show taped in New York.

Finally getting fed up with having pies thrown in his face, Powers vents his anger with society by turning his extensive training in gymnastics and fencing to a life of crime. Contracting the criminal weapons-maker the Tinkerer to make him a number of gimmicks, Powers fashions himself a harlequin-like disguise and calls himself the Jester. After gaining some notoriety as a professional thief, the Jester is hired by Richard Raleigh to get Foggy Nelson to resign his campaign for district attorney. This brings the Jester into conflict with Daredevil, who continues trying to apprehend him, even after they find Raleigh dead. Angered by Daredevil's persistence, he vows revenge.

In his civilian guise as Jonathan Powers, he stages his own murder at the hands of Daredevil. However, Daredevil clears his name by defeating and then unmasking the Jester on live television, demonstrating that his "victim" was still alive. He later escapes prison and teams up with two fellow enemies of Daredevil, the Cobra and Mister Hyde, for revenge. They lure Daredevil to an amusement park, but he defeats and apprehends them there.

The Jester later kidnaps an inventor of computer-generated video and uses his invention to broadcast false news reports smearing Foggy Nelson's re-election campaign and undermining public trust in the government and the media. Though he succeeds in making Nelson lose his post as district attorney, his plan to take over the city and execute Daredevil for murder are foiled by Daredevil and new district attorney Blake Tower. While in prison, the Jester falls under the mental control of the Purple Man, along with the Cobra, Mister Hyde and the Gladiator. The Purple Man forces them all to attack Daredevil and Paladin. He later battles the Moon Knight and Daredevil as well. 

After escaping prison, the Jester kidnaps an actor portraying Cyrano de Bergerac on live television and takes his place. His performance is a success with the audience. When he afterwards learns that Daredevil was diverting the police's attention so that he could finish his performance, he voluntarily surrenders. Later, Powers allows himself to be the host of a demon, gaining great strength in the process. When the demon leaves him, Powers is apparently left comatose.

During the Spider-Men II miniseries, the Jester turns up alive. During his recent criminal activities, the Jester was defeated by Jessica Jones and the She-Hulk.

The Jester later collaborated with Screwball when they started a web show called "Jested". Their first episode had them doing a prank on Mayor J. Jonah Jameson. After that happened, both of them are tracked down by the Superior Spider-Man (Doctor Octopus' mind in Spider-Man's body) and (after performing a series of pranks on the Superior Spider-Man himself) are brutally defeated by him.

During the Civil War II storyline, Powers apparently retires from his former role until he is arrested as part of an entrapment operation set up by undercover police officers and an informant, despite the fact that all he was doing was talking about his old days, rather than actually planning a crime. Despite the She-Hulk making a passionate argument about the need to believe in redemption and not condemn someone for their thoughts, Powers is sentenced to prison, where he is shot by a prison guard during a riot a couple of days later.

Jody Putt

Jody Putt is a fan of supervillains who obtained the costume of the original Jester after he retired to become an actor. He was given his weaponry by Doctor Doom. Among the arsenal granted to him by Doom was the "long-lived" Hulk Robot created years prior by a pair of college students and the Eternal Uni-Mind. The Jester recruited a team of villains made up of himself, the Hulk Robot, the Fenris twins, Hydro-Man, and Rock of the Hulkbusters to form the Assembly of Evil. The team was defeated by Cloak and Dagger and several intervening Avengers.

The Jester appeared during the superhero Civil War as a member of the Thunderbolts Army. As part of the Thunderbolts Army, the Jester was among the supervillains who helped capture unregistered heroes. The Jester did this due to nanobots in his system, which would electrocute him if he did not do as he was told.

The Jester and Jack O'Lantern are sent to bring in Spider-Man. They pursue the hero through the sewers. Spider-Man ends up badly injured and subdued as the two move in for the kill. Both Jack O' Lantern and the Jester are then shot dead by the Punisher. This fight and these deaths are also detailed in the Punisher: War Journal title. 

Mister Hyde later exhumed the Jester's body to find a way around the nanotechnology.

Crazy Gang Jester

Captain Britain was sent to an alternate Earth, known as Earth-238, by Merlyn. Together with Saturnyne, he hoped to save this world from the corruption that threatened it. Instead they encountered Earth-238's Mad Jim Jaspers, a lunatic with the ability to warp reality. Serving Jaspers was the Crazy Gang, which included the Jester.

The Jester, also known as the Clown, is a very agile fighter and sometimes the self-proclaimed leader of the Crazy Gang. His Earth-238 counterpart was known as Coco. This group of superhumans were based on characters from Lewis Carroll's Through the Looking-Glass. Captain Britain and Saturnyne individually managed to escape this Earth. Jaspers and the Crazy Gang, including the Jester, were killed when Earth-238 was destroyed by Saturnyne's successor, Mandragon.

Powers and abilities
Jonathan Powers is an athletic man with no superhuman abilities. His main weapons are a set of various joke gimmicks converted into deadly weapons, designed by the Tinkerer. He used a variety of modified toys and gimmicks, including a yo-yo with a weighted knob and steel cable which emits earsplitting sounds when whirled at high speed; ball bearing marbles; exploding gas-filled "popcorn"; plastic flying discs which squirt an anesthetic drug; rubber balls containing plastic explosives; an extendable artificial hand equipped with an electrical charge; an artificial hand that can be fired from a small air-cannon; and other devices. Powers also employed  miniature robots, equipped with items such as laser weaponry and diamond drill-bits, which were remotely controlled by a radio-linked microprocessor. He also employed a specially designed one-man submarine. Powers is a well-trained acrobat, hand-to-hand combatant and fencer. He is trained in gymnastics and is also a minimally talented actor.

Jody Putt has no superpowers, but possesses an arsenal of weaponry given to him by Doctor Doom.

The Crazy Gang's Jester has no superhuman powers, but he is a highly skilled acrobat, fencer and kickboxer, and carries a fencing foil.

See also
 List of jesters

References

External links
 
 
 Jester at Marvel.com

Articles about multiple fictional characters
Characters created by Alan Davis
Characters created by Alan Moore
Characters created by Gene Colan
Characters created by Stan Lee
Comics characters introduced in 1968
Comics characters introduced in 1984
Comics characters introduced in 1989
Daredevil (Marvel Comics) characters
Fictional characters from New Jersey
Fictional actors
Fictional fencers
Fictional jesters
Marvel Comics male supervillains
Marvel Comics martial artists
Marvel Comics supervillains
Spider-Man characters